On 16 October 2019, there was a bus crash near Medina, Saudi Arabia. Authorities have given no immediate cause for the crash.

The incident

At around 7 pm local time on 16 October 2019, a chartered bus carrying Asian and Arab nationals collided with an excavator on Hijra road, 170 km from Madinah and crashed. The bus was engulfed in flames with its windows blown out.

Victims

Thirty-five pilgrims were killed and four others were injured. The injured have been transferred to Al-Hamna Hospital.

References

2019 in Islam
2019 in Saudi Arabia
Transport disasters in Saudi Arabia
Road incidents in Saudi Arabia
2019 disasters in Saudi Arabia